Lygodactylus soutpansbergensis, the Soutpansberg dwarf gecko, is a species of gecko endemic to Limpopo province, South Africa. It was originally described as a subspecies of Lygodactylus ocellatus. It is known from the eponymous Soutpansberg as well as from Blouberg ranges.

References

Lygodactylus
Endemic reptiles of South Africa
Reptiles described in 1994
Taxa named by Neils Henning Gunther Jacobsen